Oarfish are huge, greatly elongated, pelagic lampriform fish belonging to the small family Regalecidae. Found in areas spanning from temperate ocean zones to tropical ones, yet rarely seen, the oarfish family contains three species in two genera.

The common name oarfish is thought to be in reference either to their highly compressed and elongated bodies, or to the now discredited belief that the fish "row" themselves through the water with their pelvic fins. The family name Regalecidae is derived from the Latin regalis, meaning "royal". The occasional beachings of oarfish after storms, and their habit of lingering at the surface when sick or dying, make oarfish a probable source of many sea serpent tales.

Although the larger species are considered game fish and are fished commercially to a minor extent, oarfish are rarely caught alive; their flesh is not well regarded for eating due to its gelatinous consistency.

Anatomy and morphology
The dorsal fin originates from above the (relatively large) eyes and runs the entire length of the fish. Of the approximately 400 dorsal fin rays, the first 10 to 13 are elongated to varying degrees, forming a trailing crest embellished with reddish spots and flaps of skin at the ray tips. The pelvic fins are similarly elongated and adorned, reduced to one to five rays each. The pectoral fins are greatly reduced and situated low on the body. The anal fin is completely absent and the caudal fin may be reduced or absent, as well, with the body tapering to a fine point. All fins lack true spines. At least one account, from researchers in New Zealand, described the oarfish as giving off "electric shocks" when touched.

Like other members of its order, the oarfish has a small yet highly protrusible oblique mouth with no visible teeth. The body is scaleless and the skin is covered with easily abraded, silvery ganoine. In the streamer fish (Agrostichthys parkeri), the skin is clad with hard tubercles. All species lack gas bladders and the number of gill rakers is variable.

Oarfish coloration is also variable; the flanks are commonly covered with irregular bluish to blackish streaks, black dots, and squiggles. These markings quickly fade following death. It is probable that these markings are bioluminescent in the deep sea.

The streamer fish is known to reach 3 m (10 ft) in length, while the largest recorded specimen of Regalecus russelii measured 5.4 m (18 ft).

Oarfish are the longest known living species of bony fish.

In some oarfishes found, end of tails may appear stump-like; this is likely the consequence of self-amputation that is thought to be a defense mechanism against predators.

Hyperostoic bone growth has been documented in several specimen of oarfish that have washed up on the coast of California. Hyperossified pterygiophores have been discovered to run along the entire dorsal length of oarfish. The function of this is to both provide structural support to the spine of oarfish during undulations (tail movement used for locomotion) and to remodel spines to prevent stress fractures that could occur from too much movement. It has also been hypothesized that this hyper ossification acts as a lever for the oarfish dorsal fins, which contributes to the organism's buoyancy. Unlike many deep-sea fish, oarfish have no swim bladders for maintaining depth in the water column. It is likely that this lack of a swim bladder forces more frequent tail undulations as the main mode of depth regulation in oarfish.

Phylogeny 
Through the analysis of the mitochondrial genome of Regalicus glesne, the phylogenetic placement of the Giant Oarfish was further verified. Oarfish are considered Lampriformes (an phylogenetic order), and they have been placed here due to their morphology. However, analysis of the mitochondrial genome of an R. glesne specimen clusters the species with Trachipterus trachypterus and Zu cristatus, two other Lampriformes. These three species were clustered together due to similarity in genetic sequence and morphology, which further supports the phylogeny and evolution of Lampriformes.

Environment
The oarfish is thought to inhabit the epipelagic to mesopelagic ocean layers, ranging from 200 meters (660 ft) to 1,000 meters (3,300 ft) and is rarely seen on the surface. A few have been found still barely alive, but usually if one floats to the surface, it dies. At the depths the oarfish live, there are few or no currents. As a result, they build little muscle mass and they cannot survive in shallower turbulent water.

Distribution
The members of the family are known to have a worldwide range. They have wide, tropical, subtropical, and warm temperate distributions. The oarfish typically reside in the mesopelagic area of the sea. However, human encounters with live oarfish are rare, and distribution information is collated from records of oarfish caught or washed ashore.

Ecology and life history
Oarfish were first described in 1772. Rare encounters with divers and accidental catches have supplied what little is known of oarfish ethology (behavior) and ecology.

A photograph on display in bars, restaurants, guesthouses and markets around Laos and Thailand captioned "Queen of Nāgas seized by the American Army at Mekhong River, Laos Military Base, on June 27, 1973, with the length of " is, as far as the caption goes, a hoax. The photograph is real, however, and was taken by Leo Smith of the Field Museum, of an oarfish found in September 1996 by United States Navy SEAL trainees on the coast of Coronado, California, USA.

Behavior
In 2001, an oarfish was filmed alive in situ: the  fish was spotted by a group of U.S. Navy personnel during the inspection of a buoy in the Bahamas. The oarfish was observed to propel itself by an amiiform mode of swimming; that is, rhythmically undulating the dorsal fin while keeping the body itself straight. Perhaps indicating a feeding posture, oarfish have been observed swimming in a vertical orientation, with their long axis perpendicular to the ocean surface. In this posture, the downstreaming light would silhouette the oarfishes' prey, making them easier to spot.

In July 2008, scientists captured footage of the rare fish swimming in its natural habitat in the mesopelagic zone in the Gulf of Mexico. It is the first ever confirmed sighting of an oarfish at depth, as most specimens are discovered dying at the sea surface or washed ashore.

As part of the SERPENT Project, five observations of apparently healthy oarfish Regalecus glesne by remotely operated vehicles were reported from the northern Gulf of Mexico between 2008 and 2011 at depths within the epipelagic and mesopelagic zones. These observations include the deepest verified record of R. glesne. In the 2011 sighting, an oarfish has been observed to switch from swimming with a vertical posture to swimming laterally, using lateral undulations of its entire body. Oarfish were found to have late or slow flight responses towards approaching remotely operated vehicles, supporting the hypothesis that oarfish have few natural predators.

From December 2009 to March 2010, unusual numbers of the slender oarfish Regalecus russelii (竜宮の使い "Ryūgū-No-Tsukai",) known in Japanese folklore as the Messenger from the Sea God's Palace, appeared in the waters and on the beaches of Japan, the appearance of which is said to portend earthquakes. After the 2011 Tōhoku earthquake and tsunami which killed over 20,000 people, many pointed to the oarfish from 2009–⁠2010 to build up this myth.

In 2016, Animal Planet aired an episode of the television series River Monsters named "Deep Sea Demon" in which Jeremy Wade was filmed during an encounter with a live oarfish while diving. The oarfish at this location seemed to be using a buoy anchor chain as a guide to ascend to the surface. On his second diving attempt, he was able to film two live oarfish as they ascended relatively close to the surface. This is the only known footage of human interaction with a healthy oarfish in its own environment. Wade was even able to touch one of the oarfish with his hand. The oarfish were propelling themselves by an amiiform mode of swimming as noted by other sightings.

In January 2019 two oarfish were found alive in the nets of fisherman on the Japanese island of Okinawa.

Feeding ecology
Oarfish feed primarily on zooplankton, selectively straining tiny euphausiids, shrimp, and other crustaceans from the water. Small fish, jellyfish, and squid are also taken. Large open-ocean carnivores are all likely predators of oarfish. It has been observed that oarfish eat by suctioning prey such as plankton blooms while in the water.

Life history
Based on their reproductive morphology, oarfish are thought to batch spawn. Within each breeding season that may last one or two months, individuals spawn once or multiple times in discrete spawning events before their gonads enter a long, regressive stage of reproductive development.

The eggs hatch after about three weeks into highly active larvae that feed on other zooplankton. The larvae have little resemblance to the adults, with long dorsal and pelvic fins and extensible mouths. Larvae and juveniles have been observed drifting just below the surface. In contrast, adult oarfish are rarely seen at the surface when not sick or injured. It is probable that the fishes go deeper as they mature.

From January to February 2019, researchers tested and recorded the first successful instance of artificial insemination and hatching of the oarfish (Regalecus russellii) using gonads from two washed-up specimens. Compared to adults, the body structure of newly hatched oarfish larvae look more compressed. The larvae often swam using mainly their pectoral fins, facing downward, with their mouths constantly open. The larvae were invertebrates but had bones in their head area, as well as fins. They died of starvation four days after they hatched.

In addition to the otolith, recent studies have revealed more information about the reproductive organs of the oarfish. Using photographs, histological cross-sections, and measurements of four samples of R. russelii, researchers were able to qualitatively describe the sexual organs of the species. These studies have shown that female oarfish have bifurcated ovaries containing a cavity through which the eggs pass before leaving the body of the oarfish. Testes on male oarfish are located in a similar place as the ovaries of female oarfish, near the digestive tract called the coelomic cavity. The oarfish have two separate, disconnected testes and the left testes observed were longer than the right testes. An analysis of these findings led researchers to conclude that R. russelii are likely batch-spawning fish that produce a large number of offspring every breeding season.

Reproduction 
Like the topic of behavior and hunting, scientists know very little about the actual breeding habits of these fish. A single female can produce hundreds of thousands, to millions of eggs. It lays its eggs in the water column and they float freely in the water.

Parasitism 
A recent study concerning the parasitization of this species revealed that the shortfin mako shark and the sperm whale could both be predators of the oarfish, based on patterns of parasite transmission. These conclusions were made based on analysis of the visceral tissue of an oarfish recovered by the Catalina Island Marine Institute in Santa Catalina Island, California.

See also
 List of fish families
 List of fish common names

Bibliography
Fishes: An Introduction to ichthyology. Peter B. Moyle and Joseph J. Cech, Jr; p. 338. Printed in 2004. Prentice-Hall, Inc.; Upper Saddle River, New Jersey.

References

External links

 Live tourist footage from kayak.
 4/9/2014 National Geographic Video
 Deepsea footage of a live oarfish, BBC website
 Oarfish pictures and information, including the truth about one Internet hoax
 Live Oarfish in La Paz Mexico in La Paz Mexico. Newsgroup entry with photos, 5-08-2007.
 9-metre oarfish beached in Mexico, Newsgroup entry with photos 9-01-07.
 Beached in Cabo San Lucas October 12, 2012, Article and pictures
 Discussion of an oarfish sighting by an undersea remote vehicle, Huffington Post
 Video and Photos of Oarfish: while sailing in Sea of Cortez, Controlled Jibe
 Marine science teacher finds carcass of 18-foot-long sea creature off California coast; October 2013 The Washington Post
 News report about the oarfish found October 2013 off southern California coast.
 Oarfish Offer Chance to Study an Elusive Animal Long Thought a Monster, "New York Times" Interpretive news article about the two oarfish found in October 2013 off the southern California coast.
 Rare footage off Gulf of Mexico (2011).
 NOAA Fisheries Oarfish photographs and podcast
 LiveSciences June 05, 2015 Oarfish: Photos of World's Longest Bony Fish
 

Regalecidae
Regalecidae

ja:リュウグウノツカイ